Thotakura Venkata Raju (Telugu: తోటకూర వెంకట రాజు), better known as T. V. Raju (1921 - 20 February 1973), was an Indian music composer who primarily worked in Telugu cinema.

He worked as an assistant composer to P. Adinarayana Rao in the film Palletoori Pilla (1950). He acted in a small role in the same film. His debut film as independent music director was Tingu Ranga (1952) directed by B. A. Subba Rao. His music in the films Panduranga Mahatyam (1957), Sri Krishna Pandaveeyam (1966) and Sri Krishnavataram (1967) is memorable. T. V. Raju also proved his mettle as versatile music composer in social drama genre movies similar to 1961 film Taxi Ramudu. Satyam assisted him for many films. His association with "NAT Combines" production house, N. T. Rama Rao films yielded many hits. He even made Mohammed Rafi sing a song for 1969 film Bhale Thammudu.

Personal life
T. V. Raju and N. T. Rama Rao spent time as room mates during their early days of struggle in the Telugu Film Industry. Thotakura Somaraju, better known as Raj and one of the composers of the duo Raj–Koti, is his son.

Filmography
Telugu
 Ting Ranga (1952)
 Pichi Pullayya (1953)
 Thodu Dongalu (1954)
 Nirupedalu (1954)
 Jayasimha (1955)
 Chintamani (1956)
 Panduranga Mahatyam (1957)
 Raja Nandini (1958)
 Sri Krishna Maya (1958)
 Bala Nagamma (1959)
 Taxi Ramudu (1961)
 Savati Koduku (1963)
Sri Simhachala Kshetra Mahima (1965)
 Sri Krishna Pandaveeyam (1966)
 Pidugu Ramudu (1966)
 Bhimanjaneya Yuddham (1966)
 Bhama Vijayam (1967)
 Chadarangam (1967)
 Kambojaraju Katha (1967)
 Sri Krishnavataram (1967)
 Ummadi Kutumbam (1967)
 Tikka Shankaraiah (1968)
 Baghdad Gajadonga (1968)
 Kalisochina Adrushtam (1968)
 Nene Monaganni (1968)
 Varakatnam (1968)
 Nindu Hrudayalu (1969)
 Bhale Tammudu (1969)
 Kathanayakudu (1969)
 Saptaswaralu (1969)
 Vichitra Kutumbam (1969)
 Marina Manishi (1970)
 Talla Pellamma (1970)
 Chinnanaati Snehithulu (1971)
 Sri Krishnanjaneya Yuddham (1972)
 Raja Mahal (1972)
 Dhanama? Daivama? (1973)

Kannada
 Chikkamma (1969)
Tamil
Kanimuthu Paappa (1972)

External links
 

1921 births
1973 deaths
Telugu people
Telugu film score composers
Kannada film score composers
20th-century Indian composers
Tamil film score composers
Indian male film score composers
20th-century male musicians